In geometry, a cardioid is a plane curve traced by a point on the perimeter of a circle that is rolling around a fixed circle of the same radius. It can also be defined as an epicycloid having a single cusp. It is also a type of sinusoidal spiral, and an inverse curve of the parabola with the focus as the center of inversion. A cardioid can also be defined as the set of points of reflections of a fixed point on a circle through all tangents to the circle.

The name was coined by Giovanni Salvemini in 1741 but the cardioid had been the subject of study decades beforehand. Although named for its heart-like form, it is shaped more like the outline of the cross section of a round apple without the stalk.

A cardioid microphone exhibits an acoustic pickup pattern that, when graphed in two dimensions, resembles a cardioid (any 2d plane containing the 3d straight line of the microphone body). In three dimensions, the cardioid is shaped like an apple centred around the microphone which is the "stalk" of the apple.

Equations 

Let  be the common radius of the two generating circles with midpoints ,  the rolling angle and the origin the starting point (see picture). One gets the
 parametric representation:  and herefrom the representation in
 polar coordinates: 
 Introducing the substitutions  and  one gets after removing the square root the implicit representation in Cartesian coordinates:

Proof for the parametric representation
A proof can be established using complex numbers and their common description as the complex plane. The rolling movement of the black circle on the blue one can be split into two rotations. Hence
 the rotation  around point  is,
 the rotation  around point  is: .

From here one gets the parametric representation above:

Metric properties 
For the cardioid as defined above the following formulas hold:
 area ,
 arc length  and
 radius of curvature 
The proofs of these statement use in both cases the polar representation of the cardioid. For suitable formulas see polar coordinate system (arc length) and polar coordinate system (area)

Properties

Chords through the cusp 
 C1 Chords through the cusp of the cardioid have the same length .
 C2 The midpoints of the chords through the cusp lie on the perimeter of the fixed generator circle (see picture).

Proof of C1 
The points  are on a chord through the cusp (=origin). Hence

Proof for C2 
For the proof the representation in the complex plane (see above) is used. For the points  and 

Cardioid as inverse curve of a parabola 

 A cardioid is the inverse curve of a parabola with its focus at the center of inversion (see graph)

For the example shown in the graph the generator circles have radius . Hence the cardioid has the polar representation

and its inverse curve

which is a parabola (s. parabola in polar coordinates) with the equation  in Cartesian coordinates.

Remark: Not every inverse curve of a parabola is a cardioid. For example, if a parabola is inverted across a circle whose center lies at the vertex of the parabola, then the result is a cissoid of Diocles.

Cardioid as envelope of a pencil of circles 

In the previous section if one inverts additionally the tangents of the parabola one gets a pencil of circles through the center of inversion (origin). A detailed consideration shows: The midpoints of the circles lie on the perimeter of the fixed generator circle. (The generator circle is the inverse curve of the parabola's directrix.)

This property gives rise to the following simple method to draw a cardioid:
 Choose a circle  and a point  on its perimeter,
 draw the envelope of these circles.

Cardioid as envelope of a pencil of lines 

A similar and simple method to draw a cardioid uses a pencil of lines. It is due to L. Cremona:

 Draw a circle, divide its perimeter into equal spaced parts with  points (s. picture) and number them consecutively.
 Draw the chords: . (That is, the second point is moved by double velocity.)
 The envelope of these chords is a cardioid.

Proof 
In order to keep the calculations simple, the proof is given for the cardioid with polar representation
 (§ Cardioids in different positions).

Equation of the tangent of the cardioid with polar representation  
From the parametric representation

one gets the normal vector . The equation of the tangent
 is:

Equation of the chord of the circle with midpoint  and radius  
For the equation of the secant line passing the two points  one gets:

With help of trigonometric formulae and the subsequent division by  the equation of the secant line can be rewritten by:

Conclusion 
Despite the two angles  have different meanings (s. picture) one gets for  the same line. Hence any secant line of the circle, defined above, is a tangent of the cardioid, too:
 The cardioid is the envelope of the chords of a circle.

Remark:
The proof can be performed with help of the envelope conditions (see previous section) of an implicit pencil of curves:

is the pencil of secant lines of a circle (s. above) and

For fixed parameter t both the equations represent lines. Their intersection point is

which is a point of the cardioid with polar equation

Cardioid as caustic of a circle 
The considerations made in the previous section give a proof that the caustic of a circle with light source on the perimeter of the circle is a cardioid.
 If in the plane there is a light source at a point  on the perimeter of a circle which is reflecting any ray, then the reflected rays within the circle are tangents of a cardioid.

Remark: For such considerations usually multiple reflections at the circle are neglected.

Cardioid as pedal curve of a circle 

The Cremona generation of a cardioid should not be confused with the following generation:

Let be  a circle and  a point on the perimeter of this circle. The following is true:
 The foots of perpendiculars from point  on the tangents of circle  are points of a cardioid.

Hence a cardioid is a special pedal curve of a circle.

Proof 
In a Cartesian coordinate system circle  may have midpoint  and radius . The tangent at circle point  has the equation

The foot of the perpendicular from point  on the tangent is point  with the still unknown distance  to the origin . Inserting the point into the equation of the tangent yields

which is the polar equation of a cardioid.

Remark: If point  is not on the perimeter of the circle , one gets a limaçon of Pascal.

The evolute of a cardioid 

The evolute of a curve is the locus of centers of curvature. In detail: For a curve  with radius of curvature  the evolute has the representation

with  the suitably oriented unit normal.

For a cardioid one gets:
 The evolute of a cardioid is another cardioid one third as large (s. picture).

Proof 
For the cardioid with parametric representation

the unit normal is

and the radius of curvature

Hence the parametric equations of the evolute are

(Trigonometric formulae were used)

Orthogonal trajectories 

An orthogonal trajectory of a pencil of curves is a curve which intersects any curve of the pencil orthogonally. For cardioids the following is true:
 The orthogonal trajectories of the pencil of cardioids with equations  are the cardioids with equations 
(The second pencil can be considered as reflections at the y-axis of the first one. See diagram.)

Proof 
For a curve given in polar coordinates by a function  the following connection to Cartesian coordinates hold:

and for the derivatives

Dividing the second equation by the first yields the Cartesian slope of the tangent line to the curve at the point :

For the cardioids with the equations  and  respectively one gets:
 and 

(The slope of any curve depends on  only, and not on the parameters  or !)

Hence

That means: Any curve of the first pencil intersectcs any curve of the second pencil orthogonally.

In different positions 
Choosing other positions of the cardioid within the coordinate system results in different equations. The picture shows the 4 most common positions of a cardioid and their polar equations.

In complex analysis 

In complex analysis, the image of any circle through the origin under the map  is a cardioid. One application of this result is that the boundary of the central period-1 component of the Mandelbrot set is a cardioid given by the equation

The Mandelbrot set contains an infinite number of slightly distorted copies of itself and the central bulb of any of these smaller copies is an approximate cardioid.

Caustics 
Certain caustics can take the shape of cardioids. The catacaustic of a circle with respect to a point on the circumference is a cardioid. Also, the catacaustic of a cone with respect to rays parallel to a generating line is a surface whose cross section is a cardioid. This can be seen, as in the photograph to the right, in a conical cup partially filled with liquid when a light is shining from a distance and at an angle equal to the angle of the cone. The shape of the curve at the bottom of a cylindrical cup is half of a nephroid, which looks quite similar.

See also 
 Limaçon
 Nephroid
 Deltoid
 Wittgenstein's rod
 Cardioid microphone
 Lemniscate of Bernoulli
 Loop antenna
 Radio direction finder
 Radio direction finding
 Yagi antenna
 Giovanni Salvemini

Notes

References

External links 

 
 
 Hearty Munching on Cardioids at cut-the-knot
 
 
 
 Xah Lee, Cardioid (1998) (This site provides a number of alternative constructions).
 Jan Wassenaar, Cardioid, (2005)

Roulettes (curve)